Kirsten Marina Costas (July 23, 1968 – June 23, 1984) was an American high school student who was murdered by her classmate Bernadette Protti in June 1984.

Background
The daughter of affluent parents Arthur and Berit Costas, Kirsten Costas and her brother Peter grew up in the small suburban town of Orinda, California. Costas attended Miramonte High School and was a member of the school's varsity swim team and the cheerleading squad.

Case
On June 23, 1984, Costas was lured with a phony invitation to a dinner for the Bob-o-Links, a sorority-like group at school. According to Protti's later testimony, she had planned to take Costas to the party to befriend her, but Costas became angry when she was told that there was no dinner for the new "Bobbies." The girls quarreled and Costas fled to the home of Alex and Mary Jane Arnold, telling them that her friend had gone "weird." When Costas could not reach her parents by telephone, Alex Arnold drove her home, noticing that the Protti family's Pinto was following them. At the Costas home, Arnold, sitting in his car, saw Protti attack Costas. He thought that he was witnessing a fistfight, but in fact Protti had stabbed Costas five times with a butcher knife and fled. The Costases' neighbors called an ambulance, but Kirsten was mortally wounded and died at a nearby hospital.

It took the police almost six months to find Costas' killer. Protti passed a lie-detector test, but her alibi went unverified. After attempting to confirm Protti's alibi, police suspected that she had lied. Following a conversation with an FBI agent who informed her that her arrest was imminent and that they knew that she had killed Kirsten, Protti wrote her mother a letter in which she made a full confession.

Protti claimed to have found the kitchen knife by chance, and her elder sister, Virginia Varela, testified in court that she kept that knife in her car to cut vegetables. The Costases did not believe Protti's story; they asserted that nobody would use an 12-inch-long butcher knife to slice tomatoes and that Protti, casually dressed that evening, never intended to take Kirsten to a party but had planned to murder her.

Aftermath
The Costas family left Orinda and moved to Hawaii in 1986. 

Protti was sentenced to a maximum of nine years, but was released seven years later in 1992 on parole at the age of 23. Costas' parents vehemently opposed Protti's release.

Adaptations
American filmmaker James Benning covered the aftermath of the murder in his 1987 documentary Landscape Suicide.

In 1994, the story was made into a television movie entitled A Friend to Die For (also known as Death of a Cheerleader), with Tori Spelling as Stacy Lockwood, a character based on Kirsten Costas and Kellie Martin as Angela Delvecchio, a character based on Bernadette Protti.

The aforementioned film was remade in 2019 as a Lifetime television movie starring Aubrey Peeples as Bridget Moretti and Sarah Dugdale as Kelli Locke, characters based on Protti and Costas, and Kellie Martin, who played Protti in the first television movie, playing the FBI Agent charged to tracking her.

Costas' murder was featured in season 5 of Deadly Women, season 1, episode 3, of Investigation Discovery's The 1980's: The Deadliest Decade, and an episode of Killer Kids titled Rumors & The To-Do List.

References

1984 in California
1984 murders in the United States
Crimes in California
Deaths by person in California
Deaths by stabbing in California
History of Contra Costa County, California
June 1984 crimes